Nick Harper (born 1965), English singer-songwriter and guitarist.

Nick Harper may also refer to:

Fictional characters
Nick Harper (My Family), fictional character in the British sitcom My Family
 Nick Harper, main character in 2004 film Face of Terror, played by Ricky Schroder

Others
Nick Harper (American football) (born 1974), former American football player in the National Football League
Nick Harper (politician) (born 1979), US politician active in Washington state